Hypocrita joiceyi is a moth of the family Erebidae. It was described by Paul Dognin in 1922. It is found in Colombia.

References

 Natural History Museum Lepidoptera generic names catalog

Hypocrita
Moths described in 1922